Xu Hongmeng (born July 1951) is a retired vice-admiral (zhong jiang) of the People's Liberation Army Navy (PLAN) of China. He served as Deputy Commander of the PLAN and Commander of the East Sea Fleet.

Biography
Xu Hongmeng was born in July 1951 in Suizhong, Liaoning Province. He graduated from the PLA Naval Command Academy.

Xu served as deputy chief of staff of the PLAN's East Sea Fleet from 1999 to 2002, and commander of the Zhoushan Naval Base from 2002 to 2005. From December 2005 to August 2006 he was deputy chief of staff of the PLAN. In August 2006, he was promoted to commander of the East Sea Fleet, and concurrently deputy commander of the Nanjing Military Region. He attained the rank of vice-admiral in July 2007. In December 2009, he was appointed deputy commander of the PLAN. He retired from active service in December 2014 after reaching the mandatory retirement age, and was replaced by Jiang Weilie.

Xu was a member of the 11th National People's Congress.

References

1951 births
Living people
People's Liberation Army generals from Liaoning
People's Liberation Army Navy admirals
People from Huludao
Delegates to the 11th National People's Congress
Commanders of the East Sea Fleet